Melvin Michel Maxence Bard (born 6 November 2000) is a French professional footballer who plays as left-back for  club Nice.

Club career

Lyon 
On 13 August 2019, Bard signed his first professional contract with Lyon. He made his professional debut with Lyon in a 4–0 Ligue 1 win over Nîmes on 6 December 2019.

Nice 
On 31 July 2021, Ligue 1 side Nice announced the signing of Bard from Lyon.

Honours 
Nice

 Coupe de France runner-up: 2021–22

References

External links
 France profile at FFF
 
 Sport.de Profile

2000 births
Living people
People from Écully
French footballers
France under-21 international footballers
France youth international footballers
Association football defenders
Olympique Lyonnais players
OGC Nice players
Ligue 1 players
Championnat National 2 players
Olympic footballers of France
Footballers at the 2020 Summer Olympics
Sportspeople from Lyon Metropolis
Footballers from Auvergne-Rhône-Alpes